Independence, originally known as Uncle Sam, is a town in Tangipahoa Parish, Louisiana, United States. The population was 1,665 at the 2010 census. It is part of the Hammond Micropolitan Statistical Area.

History

The move to establish Independence as a town was led in the early 20th century by State Representative Harry D. Wilson, who subsequently served from 1916 until his death early in 1948 as the Louisiana Commissioner of Agriculture and Forestry. Wilson was a son of Dr. and Mrs. William D. Wilson. In 1856, Dr. Wilson had built a store in Independence, which remained for years the oldest building in the community. Harry Wilson worked in the parish seat of Amite in the  general store of the merchant Jacob  Stern at a time when Tangipahoa Parish did not yet depend on the strawberry crop. During the 1890s, Wilson was an express messenger for the Illinois Central Railroad. He left that position to pursue a political career.

Affectionately known by voters as "Uncle Harry" or "Mister Harry", Wilson served two nonconsecutive terms in the state House from 1900 to 1904 and again from 1908 to 1912. A strong promoter of his hometown of Independence, located five miles to the south of Amite, Wilson in 1902 and 1903 corresponded with Governor William Wright Heard regarding incorporation of the community, which at the time had a population of 308. Governor Heard informed Wilson that he considered the three square miles proposed for the new town as too much land for a small village and suggested that the tract be reduced in size. Originally named "Uncle Sam", Independence had begun in 1852 when the New Orleans, Jackson and Great Northern Railroad began operating through the area. Independence was finally proclaimed a town on August 22, 1912.

Geography
Independence is located at  (30.635293, -90.504005).

Demographics

2020 census

As of the 2020 United States census, there were 1,635 people, 711 households, and 492 families residing in the town.

2010 census
As of the census of 2010, there were 1,665 people, 663 households, and 446 families residing in the town. The racial makeup of the town was 54.59% White (of which Italian-Americans make up 30.7% of the population ), 40.24% African American, 0.66% Native American, 1.62% Asian, 0.42% from other races, and 2.46% from two or more races. Hispanic or Latino of any race were 4.38% of the population.

There were 663 households, out of which 31.2% had children under the age of 18 living with them, 42.1% were married couples living together, 21.9% had a female householder with no husband present, and 32.7% were non-families. 28.1% of all households were made up of individuals, and 15.2% had someone living alone who was 65 years of age or older. The average household size was 2.60 and the average family size was 3.21.

In the town, the population was spread out, with 28.7% under the age of 18, 9.3% from 18 to 24, 25.5% from 25 to 44, 19.7% from 45 to 64, and 16.9% who were 65 years of age or older. The median age was 35 years. For every 100 females, there were 85.4 males. For every 100 females age 18 and over, there were 78.0 males.

The median income for a household in the town was $22,446, and the median income for a family was $30,685. Males had a median income of $28,125 versus $17,105 for females. The per capita income for the town was $10,495. About 20.8% of families and 29.3% of the population were below the poverty line, including 42.3% of those under age 18 and 24.0% of those age 65 or over.

Education
Tangipahoa Parish School Board operates public schools:
Independence High Magnet School
Independence Leadership Academy

Arts and culture
Independence has a large Italian-American community, as do neighboring towns and villages. Independence has a Sicilian heritage festival every year the second weekend in March. Independence has sometimes been referred to colloquially as Little Italy, and Italian expatriates began settling here as early as the 19th Century.

Many attributes of the Italian culture, including food, in Independence are described in Italian Culture in Independence. Other useful resources are Southeastern Louisiana University's Center for Regional Studies and the Tangipahoa Parish tourist information center.

Notable people
 Nick Bruno, President of the University of Louisiana at Monroe
 Robert Crais, best-selling novelist
 Steven Jyles, a Canadian Football League quarterback
 Frank Lockett, former NFL wide receiver for the Miami Dolphins
 Carl Marshall, Southern Soul Singer
 Clif Richardson, former state representative
 LaBrandon Toefield, former LSU star runningback and NFL runningback for the Jacksonville Jaguars and Carolina Panthers

References

Towns in Louisiana
Towns in Tangipahoa Parish, Louisiana
Italian-American culture in Louisiana
French-American culture in Louisiana